Al-Asma' wa al-Sifat, is a major classic of Islamic theology authored by Al-Bayhaqi. It was said such a book have never existed like this and for this reason the author was considered a pioneer in this field.

Content
Al-Bayhaqi was a staunch defender of the Ash'ari school using textual evidences and the sayings of the pious predecessors proving his creed is with accordance to the earliest Muslims. He also takes his chance to refute different sects who indulge in two extreme methodologies I.e; those who engage in extreme literalism that liken God with his creation and those that engage in extreme figurativeness by distorting the meaning and rejecting prophetic traditions. Al-Bayhaqi's polemic book is to prove his affirmation of all the names and attributes of God. He doesn't only suffice himself with transmission but also uses reason to clarify the difficult narrations he brings forth and with some he stays silent (tafwid).  

Muhammad Zahid al-Kawthari said:“So [i.e., al-Bayhaqi] wrote the book (Asmaa wa’l-Sifat) seeking to investigate the hadiths contained in the chapters, clarifying the correct and defective ones, and confirming The face of the speech in the texts contained in the names and attributes, quoting the leaders of consideration and the masters of interpretation, the meanings intended by them, so he was very good at benevolence and excelled in all proficiency, except in a few places that were forgiven in the sea of his bountiful grace. From the people of his time and after him, from what they got involved in of deviance, and the people of theory knew the correct news that they are not justified in denying it from the false narratives, so it is cured and enough."

In Bayhaqi's massive compilation of anthropomorphic traditions (Al-Asma' wa al-Sifat), he dedicated an entire chapter on ahadith that mention the divine laughter. He explains that the laughter could mean "revealing" or "uncovering" based on the classical Arabic language: "The Bedouins: say "the earth laughs when the plants grow", because the earth reveals the beauty of the plants and uncovers the flowers". According to Al-Bayhaqi, God did not actually laugh but revealed his benevolence.

Reception
Al-Dhahabi said: "Nothing like it has been transmitted." 

Ibn al-Subki highly praised this book and said: “I do not know anything that compares to it.”

References 

Sunni literature
Hadith
Books about Islam
Kalam
Ash'ari literature
Islamic theology books
Islamic belief and doctrine
11th-century books